The discography of Powderfinger, an Australian alternative rock group, consists of seven studio albums, thirty-three singles, six extended plays, three live albums, four compilation albums, one video album and twenty-nine music videos. They have been nominated for forty-nine ARIA Music Awards, of which they have won eighteen. Shortly after the independent release of their debut self-titled EP in 1993, Powderfinger signed on to a major record label to release their second EP, Transfusion. In 1994 they issued their debut album Parables for Wooden Ears, which did not reach the ARIA Albums Chart. After performances at music festivals, touring and supporting international artists, Powderfinger released their second studio album, Double Allergic (1996), which became their charting breakthrough by peaking at No. 4. Following public recognition from the album's high-selling singles, Powderfinger went on to release Internationalist in 1998, which was their first number-one album; it was certified five times platinum by ARIA for shipment of 350,000 copies.

In September 2000, the group released their fourth album, Odyssey Number Five, which also reached number one; it was certified eight times platinum for shipment of 560,000 copies. Two of the album's songs, "These Days" and "My Kinda Scene" were released on the soundtracks for Two Hands (1999), and Mission: Impossible 2 (2000). Their fifth album, Vulture Street, was released in 2003, and became their third number-one album; it was six times platinum for 420,000 copies. In 2004, the group released their first greatest hits album composed of tracks from their early recording era, Fingerprints: The Best of Powderfinger, 1994–2000. Weeks later, the group released their first live album, which also appeared in DVD form. The group then had a hiatus to allow its members to pursue various side projects. After two years, the band regrouped and released their sixth studio album, Dream Days at the Hotel Existence in 2007, and Golden Rule in 2009. Golden Rule became their fifth studio album in a row which reached number-one. On 13 November 2010 Powderfinger performed for the last time. In November 2011, the group issued a second greatest hits album, Footprints: The Best of Powderfinger, 2001–2011.

In May 2020, the group reformed for a one-off livestreamed charity performance titled One Night Lonely. An EP of the performance released on 25 May 2020.

Albums

Studio albums

Live albums

Compilation albums

Notes
 ^ A. Footprints: The Best of Powderfinger 2001–2011 was released simultaneously with Fingerprints & Footprints: Ultimate Collection, which features both "best of" albums. Each appeared on the ARIA Albums Chart Top 50 over the same eight weeks

Box sets

Extended plays

Videos

Singles

Other charted and certified songs

Other appearances

Music videos
The first eight of Powderfinger's music videos were directed by David Barker. The group then collaborated with several production companies, including working with Fifty Fifty Films' Scott Walton from 1999.

See also

 List of awards and nominations received by Powderfinger

References

External links
 Powderfinger discography  archived from the original on 4 October 2009 on Powderfinger's Official Website.
 
 

Discography
Discographies of Australian artists
Rock music group discographies